Flawless is a 2007 British fictional heist crime film directed by Michael Radford, written by Edward Anderson, and starring Michael Caine and Demi Moore. It premiered 11 February 2007 in Germany. The film had a limited release in the United States on 28 March 2008.

Plot
A reporter enters a restaurant to interview Miss Laura Quinn, the only woman to ever have been a manager at the London Diamond Corporation, for a puff piece about the first generation of women entering the workforce. Quinn places a box on the table, revealing a huge diamond, and says,   "I stole it." The reporter, suddenly enthralled, assumes that Quinn has been in prison for the theft all this time.

The story then flashes back to 1960, when Quinn was still employed as a manager at London Diamond Corporation. She is passed over for a promotion for the sixth time despite being intellectually superior to her male co-workers. Quinn discovers she is due to be fired from the janitor, Hobbs. He offers her a place in a plot: stealing enough diamonds to make them rich, but not enough to be noticed. Knowing she is considered old by her coworkers and has few other professional prospects, she agrees. At a social event at the Company President's mansion, she finds the vault combination codes.

On shakes terms, Quinn and Hobbs hatch a plan, exploiting a weakness in the new camera security system. However, Hobbs manages to lift every single diamond from the vault, almost two tons worth, and by way of a proxy, holds them for a ransom of 100 million pounds. The head of the insurance syndicate from King's Row is forced to pay the ransom, leaving him financially ruined. Quinn, having never agreed to this, now finds herself trapped.

The company hires a private investigator, Mr. Finch, to keep the matter from going public. Suspicious from the start, Finch keeps a close eye on Hobbs and Quinn. Quinn seeks to avoid capture and jail by giving the diamonds back but Hobbs refuses to negotiate. Having no idea where he has hidden them, she conceals their scheme while assisting Finch with the investigation.

The situation escalates when the diamonds are not returned, and the incident is leaked to the Press. The president of London Diamond Corporation has a heart attack due to the stress. Feeling cornered while out for a drink with Finch, Quinn runs to the bathroom and cries uncontrollably. After losing her diamond earring down the drain, she gets an idea as to how the heist could have been pulled and where the diamonds could be. After Finch excuses himself, she goes down into the sewers under the company and finds Hobbs guarding a passage. He pulls a gun on her, but she finds a huge pile of diamonds at her feet. Hobbs confesses he has no interest in the diamonds or the money and wants to ruin the head of the insurance syndicate whose deliberate delay in covering his wife's medical expenses resulted in her death many years before.

Once the deadline for the ransom has passed, resulting in the insurance head's suicide, Hobbs leaves. Quinn finds the rest of the diamonds and calls Finch claiming she followed a hunch. While there is questionable proof she was involved in the incident, Finch is unwilling to press charges against Quinn because he has been involved with her emotionally. While touching her lips, he tells her that the evidence against her is inconclusive. The company recovers the stolen property and implies to the press that the theft was just a rumour.

The story returns to the present. Quinn tells the reporter she resigned and shortly after received a letter from a bank in Switzerland. Hobbs apologized for involving her, saying that he had needed a disgruntled employee for access to the diamond vault, and as compensation gave her the ransom money. Quinn details how she spent the rest of her life donating all the unspent money to many different organizations and people in need.

Cast
 Michael Caine as Mr. Hobbs
 Demi Moore as Laura Quinn
 Lambert Wilson as Finch
 Joss Ackland as Milton Kendrick Ashtoncroft
 Constantine Gregory as Dmitriev
 Ahmed Ayman as Bondok
 Natalie Dormer as Cassie, the reporter

Critical reception
The film received mixed reviews from critics. , the film holds a 55% approval rating on the review aggregator Rotten Tomatoes, based on 95 ratings with an average rating of 5.71 out of 10. The website's critics consensus reads: "Michael Caine's excellent performance makes Flawless something more than an average heist movie." Metacritic reported the film had an average score of 57 out of 100, based on 21 reviews.

References

External links

 
 
 
 
 

2007 films
2000s crime thriller films
2000s heist films
2000s historical films
British crime thriller films
British heist films
British historical films
Luxembourgian crime thriller films
Films set in 1960
Films set in London
Films shot in Luxembourg
Films directed by Michael Radford
Films scored by Stephen Warbeck
Magnolia Pictures films
2000s English-language films
English-language Luxembourgian films
2000s American films
2000s British films